Jorightu Khan, (1358–1391) was a khagan of the Northern Yuan dynasty, reigning from 1388 to 1391. The identity of Jorightu is disputed: some scholars believe that Jorightu was the same individual as Yesüder, a descendant of Ariq Böke, and that Engke Khan was Yesüder's son succeeding him; while Erdeniin Tobchi believe that Jorigthu Khan and Engke Khan were the same person with different titles. His title, "Jorightu Khagan", means "Brave Emperor" in the Mongolian language.

After the murder of Uskhal Khan by Yesüder, the unified Mongol tribes quickly disintegrated. Gunashiri, a descendant of Chagatai Khan, founded the state of Kara Del in Hami, in modern Xinjiang. Uskhal Khan's former minister, Necelai, submitted to the Ming dynasty in 1389 and the Ming established a Mongol guard of Tyuanin (also known as Three Guards) under him in Daiying, modern Inner Mongolia. However, the late khan's chingsang, Shirmen, allied with Yesüder, killed Necelai.

The former prince of Liao (Liaodong) and one of the leaders of the Three Guards, Ajashir, threw his allegiance to Yesüder some time after 1389.

See also
 List of khans of the Northern Yuan dynasty

References

1358 births
1391 deaths
Northern Yuan rulers
14th-century Mongol rulers
14th-century Chinese monarchs